Güney is a town (belde) and municipality in the Sinanpaşa District, Afyonkarahisar Province, Turkey. Its population is 2,383 (2021). It consists of 5 quarters: Çalışlar, Yeni, Orta, Aşağı and Yukarı.

References

Populated places in Sinanpaşa District
Towns in Turkey